I Was All His is a 1958 West German drama film directed by Wolfgang Becker and starring Barbara Rütting, Carlos Thompson and Wolfgang Preiss. It was shot at the Carlton Studios in Munich and on location in the city. The film's sets were designed by the art director Wolf Englert.

Cast
 Barbara Rütting as Anette Klinger
 Carlos Thompson as Nikolei Stein
 Wolfgang Preiss as Dr. Leipold
 Kai Fischer as Kätzchen
 Corny Collins as Renate
 Siegfried Lowitz as Herr Hinze
 Lina Carstens as Frau Mertens
 Lukas Ammann as Dessouki
 Michl Lang as Herr Mertens
 Maria Stadler as Lene

References

Bibliography 
 James Robert Parish. Film Directors Guide: Western Europe. Scarecrow Press, 1976.

External links 
 

1958 films
West German films
German drama films
1958 drama films
1950s German-language films
Films directed by Wolfgang Becker (director, born 1910)
1950s German films